Satory is an area south of Versailles in France. It is mostly known for its military camp, housing:
 Weapon-testing facilities of Nexter Systems
 Barracks and facilities for Gendarmerie including the GIGN headquarters and the Mobile Gendarmerie armored grouping (GBGM);
 Musique des Troupes de Marine 
 Military barracks.
 The areas hosted some of the shooting events for the 1900 Summer Olympics.

The camp was also the original site for the Eurosatory international defense exhibition.

References

Venues of the 1900 Summer Olympics
Olympic shooting venues
Versailles
Île-de-France region articles needing translation from French Wikipedia